The 1977 Western Championships, also known as the Cincinnati Open, was a men's tennis tournament played on outdoor clay courts at the Sunlite Swim and Tennis Club at Old Coney in Cincinnati, Ohio in the United States that was part of the 1977 Colgate-Palmolive Grand Prix. It was the 77th edition of the tournament and was held from August 11 through August 18, 1977. Third-seeded Harold Solomon won the singles title.

Finals

Singles
 Harold Solomon defeated  Mark Cox 6–2, 6–3
 It was Solomon's 2nd singles title of the year and the 12th of his career.

Doubles
 John Alexander /  Phil Dent defeated  Bob Hewitt /  Roscoe Tanner 6–3, 7–6

References

External links
 
 ATP tournament profile
 ITF tournament edition details

Cincinnati Open
Cincinnati Masters
Cincinnati Open
Cincinnati Open
Cincinnati Open